The Sony Ericsson Xperia pro is an Android smartphone from Sony Ericsson which was launched in October 2011. The Xperia Pro has a  capacitive touch-screen, slider keyboard, smart phone with mobile BRAVIA engine which optimises the picture and runs at a resolution of 854×480 pixels, a 1 GHz Snapdragon processor, an 8.1 mega-pixel camera, a dedicated Two-step camera key, USB host port, HDMI-out, 512 MB of onboard RAM, and an 8 GB microSD card (expandable up to 32 GB with Android 2.3; up to 128 GB with Android 4.04). The Sony Ericsson Xperia Pro is available in black, silver, or red.

Overview 

The Xperia Pro comes pre-installed with the Android 2.3 (Gingerbread) operating system. As of June 2012, Sony Xperia Pro users can upgrade their phone through Sony Update to Android 4.0.4 (Ice Cream Sandwich).

A number of users have, after upgrading to Android 4.0.x Ice Cream Sandwich, encountered a problem with the QWERTY physical keyboard being changed to AZERTY format and vice versa. This issue has been resolved as of 1 September 2012.

It has one front-facing camera, one rear camera with flash, and a back-lit, sliding, qwerty keyboard – just like other Xperia pro variants.

The display features a Sony Mobile BRAVIA Engine which allows users to view pictures and video on the 3.7" Reality display.

It also features an Exmor R sensor that allows for the capture of high definition movies and stills in low lit areas, which can then be shown in HD on a TV via the HDMI connector.

Reception

The Xperia Pro was first revealed on 13 February 2011, a day before MWC 2011, along with Xperia Play and Xperia Neo.

See also
List of Android devices
List of Xperia devices

References

External links
Xperia Pro official website
Whitepaper PDF with technical details
Specifications
Xperia pro official white paper (PDF)
Whitepaper PDF with technical details (PDF)

Android (operating system) devices
Sony Ericsson smartphones
Mobile phones introduced in 2011
Mobile phones with an integrated hardware keyboard
Slider phones